Class 720 may refer to:

British Rail Class 720
New South Wales 620/720 class railcar
South Australian Railways 720 class